Sun Long may refer to:
 Sun Long (painter)
 Sun Long (speed skater)